Dondice parguerensis is a species of colourful sea slug, an aeolid nudibranch, a marine gastropod mollusk in the family Facelinidae.

Distribution
This species was described from Puerto Rico. It has been reported from Belize.

References

Facelinidae
Gastropods described in 1985